The 2019-20 Cornell Big Red Men's ice hockey season was the 104th season of play for the program and the 59th season in the ECAC Hockey conference. The Big Red represented the Cornell University and played their home games at Lynah Rink, and were coached by Mike Schafer, in his 25th season as their head coach.

Season
The season was ultimately cut short by the coronavirus pandemic but Cornell finished their 29-game regular season schedule with an overall record of 23-2-4 and a record of 18-2-2 in the ECAC Hockey conference. Cornell finished the ECAC season in sole possession of first place thus winning the Cleary Cup for the third straight year and was the number one seed in the ECAC Hockey tournament which was ultimately canceled before the quarterfinal round began. Cornell also won the Ivy League championship for the third straight year.

Coach Schafer was named the co-winner of the Spencer Penrose Award as Division 1 Coach of the Year with Brad Berry of the University of North Dakota. He was also named ECAC Hockey Coach of Year, winning the Tim Taylor Award for a record setting fifth time, as well as being named Ivy League Coach of the Year for the third time.

Cornell finished the truncated season atop both the USCHO and USA Today polls.

Departures

Recruiting

Roster
As of November 26, 2019.

Standings

Schedule and Results

|-
!colspan=12 style=";" | Exhibition

|-
!colspan=12 style=";" | Regular Season

|-
!colspan=12 style=";" | 

|-
!colspan=12 style=";" | 
|- align="center" bgcolor="#e0e0e0"
|colspan=12|Remainder of Tournament Cancelled

† Postponed from February 7 due to inclement weather.

Scoring statistics

Goaltending statistics

Rankings

References

Cornell Big Red men's ice hockey seasons
Cornell Big Red
Cornell Big Red
2019 in sports in New York (state)
2020 in sports in New York (state)